David Rivard (born 1953 in Fall River, Massachusetts) is an American poet. He is the author of seven books including Wise Poison, winner the 1996 James Laughlin Award, and Standoff, winner the 2017 PEN New England Award in Poetry. He is also a Professor of English Creative Writing in the Masters of Fine Arts program at the University of New Hampshire.

His poems and essays have appeared in numerous literary magazines, including New England Review, Ploughshares, Poetry, and TriQuarterly.

Early life
Rivard was born in Fall River, Massachusetts and grew up in a blue-collar family of civil servants and dressmakers. His father was a fireman and his great-grandfather is the first Portuguese policeman in Fall River. He is the oldest of four. 

Rivard holds a B.A. from the University of Massachusetts Dartmouth and an M.F.A. from the University of Arizona. He studied under Jon Anderson, Tess Gallagher, and Steve Orlen. Among his classmates were Tony Hoagland, David Wojahn, and Li-Young Lee.

Awards
 Two grants from the National Endowment for the Arts
 Fellowship from the Massachusetts Arts Foundation
 Fellowship the Fine Arts Work Center in Provincetown
 Celia B. Wagner Award from the Poetry Society of America
 Pushcart Prize
 O. B. Hardison, Jr. Poetry Prize
 1987 Agnes Lynch Starrett Poetry Prize
 1996 James Laughlin Award for his second collection of poems Wise Poison
 2001 Guggenheim Fellowship

Works

Ploughshares

Books
 Some of You Will Know, (Arrowsmith Press, 2022) 
 Standoff, (Graywolf Press, 2016) 
 Otherwise Elsewhere, (Graywolf Press, 2010) 
 Sugartown, (Graywolf Press, 2006) 
 Bewitched Playground, (Graywolf Press, 2000) 
 Wise Poison, (Graywolf Press, 1996) 
 Torque (1987), which won the Agnes Lynch Starrett Poetry Prize and was published by the Pitt Poetry Series.

Criticism

References

External links

1953 births
American male poets
Agnes Lynch Starrett Poetry Prize winners
Living people
National Endowment for the Arts Fellows
Tufts University faculty
Vermont College of Fine Arts faculty
University of New Hampshire faculty